Brassy may refer to:
Brassy, Somme, a French municipality in the région of Picardy
Brassy, Nièvre, a French municipality in the région of Burgundy
Brassy (band), a British band

See also
Brass